Ghanem Zaid (born 28 February 1965) is a Kuwaiti athlete. He competed in the men's javelin throw at the 1988 Summer Olympics and the 1992 Summer Olympics.

References

External links
 

1965 births
Living people
Athletes (track and field) at the 1988 Summer Olympics
Athletes (track and field) at the 1992 Summer Olympics
Kuwaiti male javelin throwers
Olympic athletes of Kuwait
Place of birth missing (living people)